Several historical figures are known by the epithet the Bad:

Arnulf, Duke of Bavaria (died 937)
Charles II of Navarre (1332–1387), King of Navarre and Count of Évreux
William I of Sicily (1131–1166), second King of Sicily

In the spaghetti Western film The Good, the Bad and the Ugly, Lee Van Cleef played the second titled character.

See also
List of people known as the Good
List of people known as the Evil
 Bad (disambiguation)

Lists of people by epithet